The 1872 United States presidential election in Pennsylvania took place on November 5, 1872, as part of the 1872 United States presidential election. Voters chose 29 representatives, or electors to the Electoral College, who voted for president and vice president.

Pennsylvania voted for the Republican candidate, Ulysses S. Grant, over the Liberal Republican candidate, Horace Greeley. Grant won Pennsylvania by a margin of 24.42%.

Results

See also
 List of United States presidential elections in Pennsylvania

References

Pennsylvania
1872
1872 Pennsylvania elections